The Lyon Nunataks are a group of nunataks lying west of the Grossman Nunataks and  northwest of the Behrendt Mountains, in Palmer Land, Antarctica. They include Grossenbacher Nunatak, Holtet Nunatak, Christoph Nunatak and Isakson Nunatak. The group was mapped by the United States Geological Survey from surveys and U.S. Navy air photos, 1961–67, and was named by the Advisory Committee on Antarctic Names after Owen R. Lyon, hospital corpsman, U.S. Navy, chief petty officer in charge of Eights Station in 1965.

References

Nunataks of Palmer Land